Marshall County is a county in the U.S. state of Indiana. Census 2020 recorded the population at 46,095. The county seat (and only city) is Plymouth.

History
The Indiana State Legislature passed an omnibus county bill on 7 February 1835 that authorized the creation of thirteen counties in northeast Indiana, including Marshall. It was named for U.S. Chief Justice John Marshall, who died in 1835. The government of the county was organized in 1836, during the early years of settlement and before the forced removal of the Potawatomi people in 1838. The first settlers had arrived in the county in 1835; they arrived as a result of the end of the Black Hawk War as well as the completion of the Erie Canal. They consisted primarily of settlers from New England, "Yankees" descended from the English Puritans who settled New England in the colonial era. They were mainly members of the Congregational Church, although due to the Second Great Awakening many of them had converted to Methodism and some had become Baptists before migrating to the new area. As a result of this heritage, some place names in Marshall County are named after places in New England, such as Plymouth, which is named after Plymouth, Massachusetts, the site where the Mayflower landed in 1620.

Geography
The low, rolling hills of Marshall County are completely devoted to agriculture where possible (significant drainages are wooded). The highest points on the terrain are three approximately equal swells (900'/274 meters ASL) along the south border line with Fulton County, 1.4 mile (2.2 km) NW of Richland Center.

Marshall County contains three significant bodies of water: Lake of the Woods (NE portion); Lake Maxinkuckee (SW portion); and part of Koontz Lake (NW portion). The Yellow River flows through northern, central, and western portions of Marshall County, past Plymouth; the Tippecanoe River flows southwesterly through the SE part of the county.

Adjacent counties

 St. Joseph County - north
 Elkhart County - northeast
 Kosciusko County - east
 Fulton County - south
 Pulaski County - southwest
 Starke County - west/CST Border

Protected areas
 Menominee Wetland Conservation Area (W of Plymouth)
 Potawatomi Wildlife Park (on W bank of Tippecanoe River in SE county)

Major highways

Communities

City and towns

 Argos
 Bourbon
 Bremen
 Culver
 Lapaz
 Plymouth (city)

Census-designated place
 Koontz Lake (partial)

Unincorporated communities

 Burr Oak
 Donaldson
 Harris
 Hibbard
 Inwood (called "Pearson" 1854–1856)
 Maxinkuckee
 Old Tip Town
 Teegarden
 Tippecanoe
 Tyner
 Walnut

Townships

 Bourbon
 Center
 German
 Green
 North
 Polk
 Tippecanoe
 Union
 Walnut
 West

Climate and weather

Government

The county government is a constitutional body, and is granted specific powers by the Constitution of Indiana, and by the Indiana Code.

County council: The legislative branch of the county government; controls spending and revenue collection in the county. Representatives are elected to four-year terms from county districts. They set salaries, the annual budget, and special spending. The council has limited authority to impose local taxes, in the form of an income and property tax that is subject to state level approval, excise taxes, and service taxes.

Board of commissioners: The executive body of the county; commissioners are elected county-wide, to staggered four-year terms. One commissioner serves as president. The commissioners execute acts legislated by the council, collect revenue, and manage the functions of the county government.

Current commissioners:
Stan Klotz, Mike Burroughs, Kevin Overmyer (as of July 2020)

Court: The county maintains a small claims court that handles civil cases. The judge on the court is elected to a term of four years and must be a member of the Indiana Bar Association. The judge is assisted by a constable who is also elected to a four-year term. In some cases, court decisions can be appealed to the state level circuit court.

County Officials: The county has other elected offices, including sheriff, coroner, auditor, treasurer, recorder, surveyor, and circuit court clerk. Officials are elected to four-year terms. Members elected to county government positions are required to declare party affiliations and to be residents of the county.

Marshall County is part of Indiana's 2nd congressional district and is currently represented by Jackie Walorski in the United States Congress. It is also part of Indiana Senate districts 5 and 9 and Indiana House of Representatives districts 17 and 23.

Demographics

As of the 2010 United States Census, there were 47,051 people, 17,406 households, and 12,516 families in the county. The racial makeup of the county was 93.5% white, 0.5% black or African American, 0.5% Asian, 0.2% American Indian, 3.8% from other races, and 1.5% from two or more races. Those of Hispanic or Latino origin made up 8.4% of the population. In terms of ancestry, 35.4% were German, 11.2% were Irish, 9.4% were American, and 8.5% were English.

Of the 17,406 households, 35.2% had children under the age of 18 living with them, 57.2% were married couples living together, 9.9% had a female householder with no husband present, 28.1% were non-families, and 24.1% of all households were made up of individuals. The average household size was 2.66 and the average family size was 3.15. The median age was 38.4 years.

The median income for a household in the county was $47,697 and the median income for a family was $58,017. Males had a median income of $43,732 versus $30,033 for females. The per capita income for the county was $22,493. About 8.7% of families and 12.2% of the population were below the poverty line, including 17.1% of those under age 18 and 10.4% of those age 65 or over.

See also
 National Register of Historic Places listings in Marshall County, Indiana

References

 
1836 establishments in Indiana
Sundown towns in Indiana